These quarterbacks have started at least one game for the Detroit Lions of the National Football League. They are listed in order of the date of each player's first start at quarterback for the Lions. As of the beginning of the 2021 season, their starting quarterback was Jared Goff.

Regular season

The number of games they started during the season is listed to the right:

Postseason

Team Career Passing Records 
Through the 2020 NFL Regular Season

Team Career Win / Loss Record 
Through the 2020 NFL Regular Season

Detroit Lions

quarterbacks